Kevin Patrick Harper (born 15 January 1976) is a football coach and former player. He played as a winger for Hibernian, Derby County, Walsall, Portsmouth, Norwich City, Leicester City, Stoke City, Carlisle United and Dunfermline Athletic. Born in England, played for the Scotland U21 national team. He managed Scottish League Two side Albion Rovers from November 2018 to May 2020.

Personal life
Harper was born in Oldham and raised in Glasgow's Possilpark area, attending St. Theresa's Primary and St. Augustine's Secondary School.

Playing career

Hibernian
Harper played for youth club Hutchison Vale in Edinburgh before he was signed by Hibernian and made his professional debut aged just 17. As a black footballer, Harper was in a small minority within Scottish football. He was unhappy that having claimed Gary Mackay had racially abused him during an Edinburgh derby game in November 1996, the SFA did not take action in response to his complaint.

England
Derby County manager Jim Smith signed Harper for £300,000 in September 1998. Harper scored two goals for Derby; one against Liverpool in the league and one against Swansea City in the FA Cup. He was loaned out to Walsall in December 1999 for the remainder of the season.

His spell at Walsall was cut short when Portsmouth made an offer of £300,000 for his services in March 2000. Harper moved to Fratton Park having started only seven games for Derby. The Scottish under-21 international soon settled into the team at Portsmouth, but missed much of the 2000–01 season with a shin splints problem. In 2001–02 he had the dubious honour of having been sent off (twice) more times than he scored (once). However, he was a crucial member of the side that won the First Division title in 2002–03.

Despite his impressive part in Portsmouth's promotion, Harper was loaned out to Norwich in September 2003. His loan spell at Carrow Road was initially for one month but was extended to three months. He played well at Norwich, but was also sent off for a two-footed tackle on Luciano Zavagno in a match against Derby County. He contributed nine league appearances during Norwich's 2003/04 season after which they were promoted to the Premier League as First Division champions in his absence. On his return to Fratton Park he made only nine appearances for Portsmouth in the 2003–04 season. After failing to regain his place at the start of the 2004–05 season he was loaned to Leicester City.

In January 2005 was sold to Stoke City. Despite starting his Stoke career impressively, Harper was dogged by injuries that prevented him challenging for a first team place. He scored once for Stoke, in a 3–1 win over Norwich City. Harper was loaned to Carlisle United in October 2006 and then Walsall, whom he had played for on loan earlier in his career. He was released by Stoke manager Tony Pulis in May 2007.

Return to Scotland
On 7 July 2007, Harper opted to join Dunfermline Athletic, of the Scottish First Division. He scored the winning goal against Stirling Albion on 25 August 2007 and played in Dunfermline's UEFA Cup matches at home 16 August and away 30 August against BK Hacken FC of Sweden. Harper's season was rather inconsistent, though on 25 March 2008 he scored a hat-trick in a re-arranged fixture against First Division strugglers Stirling Albion.

Coaching career
Following the departure of their Under 20s coach, SPFL side Airdrieonians appointed Harper as the replacement in July 2015. He left this post in September 2015. Harper has also set up his own football academy based in Stepps.

In November 2015, Thorniewood United manager and former Hibernian team-mate Andy Frame, persuaded Harper to come out of retirement and join the club in a player-coach role.

Harper was appointed Albion Rovers manager in November 2018. He became the first black, Asian or minority ethnic manager of a Scottish club since Márcio Máximo in 2003. A struggling Rovers side won none of their first 12 matches under Harper, but then won five of their last nine fixtures in 2018–19 Scottish League Two to avoid relegation. In May 2019, Harper extended his contract with the club to the end of the 2019–20 season. Albion again avoided relegation by finishing ninth in that season, but Harper decided to leave the club at the end of his contract in May 2020. Harper later revealed that, despite having avoided relegation again with a very poor 9th-place finish, he had been offered reduced terms, in line with a greatly reduced club budget due to prevailing circumstances, to stay and believed the board could match the ambition he had for the club.

In June 2020, Harper appeared in a special podcast panel discussing his experiences of racism in football with A View from the Terrace host Craig Fowler.

Career statistics

Club

Managerial statistics

References

External links
 

1976 births
Living people
People from Oldham
Footballers from Oldham
Footballers from Glasgow
Scottish footballers
Association football wingers
Hibernian F.C. players
Derby County F.C. players
Walsall F.C. players
Portsmouth F.C. players
Norwich City F.C. players
Leicester City F.C. players
Stoke City F.C. players
Carlisle United F.C. players
Dunfermline Athletic F.C. players
Scottish Football League players
Premier League players
English Football League players
Scotland B international footballers
Black British sportsmen
Scotland under-21 international footballers
Lothian Thistle Hutchison Vale F.C. players
Thorniewood United F.C. players
Scottish Junior Football Association players
Scottish football managers
Scottish Professional Football League managers
Albion Rovers F.C. managers
Anglo-Scots
People from Possilpark